Cristian Maino (born July 9, 1971) is an Argentine sprint canoer who competed in the early 1990s. He was eliminated in the semifinals of the K-4 1000 m event at the 1992 Summer Olympics in Barcelona.

References
Sports-Reference.com profile

1971 births
Argentine male canoeists
Canoeists at the 1992 Summer Olympics
Living people
Olympic canoeists of Argentina
Place of birth missing (living people)